Grancey may refer to:

In places:
 Grancey-le-Château-Neuvelle, a commune in the Côte-d'Or department in eastern France
 Poinson-lès-Grancey, a commune in the Haute-Marne department in northeastern France
 Grancey-sur-Ource, a commune in the Côte-d'Or department in eastern France

In people:
 Edmond de Mandat-Grancey (1842-1911), a French journalist, writer and naval officer
 Galiot Mandat de Grancey (1731-1792), a French nobleman, general and politician
 Jacques Eléonor Rouxel de Grancey (1655-1725), Marshal of France